There have been six baronetcies created with the surname of Leigh: two in the Baronetage of England, one in the Baronetage of Ireland, one in the Baronetage of Great Britain and two in the Baronetage of the United Kingdom. The only creation remaining extant is that of Altrincham, while another (that of South Carolina) is dormant.

The Leigh Baronetcy, of Stoneleigh in the County of Warwick, was created in the Baronetage of England on 29 June 1611. For more information on this creation, see the Baron Leigh (1643 creation).

The Leigh Baronetcy, of Newnham in the County of Warwick, was created in the Baronetage of England on 24 December 1618. For more information on this creation, see the Earl of Chichester (1644 creation).

The Leigh Baronetcy, of Tyrone, was created in the Baronetage of Ireland in February 1622 for Sir Daniel Leigh. The title became extinct on the death of, his son Sir Arthur Leigh, 2nd Baronet in 1638.

The Leigh Baronetcy, of South Carolina, America, was created in the Baronetage of Great Britain on 15 May 1773 for Egerton Leigh, Attorney-General of the British colony of South Carolina, grandson of the Revd Peter Leigh, of West Hall, High Legh, Cheshire by his wife Elizabeth Egerton, only daughter and eventual heiress of The Hon. Thomas Egerton, of Tatton Park, third son of John Egerton, 2nd Earl of Bridgwater. It is not known whether there exist any male descendants of Sir Samuel Egerton Leigh, 3rd Baronet, thus the title became dormant upon his death.

The Leigh Baronetcy, of Whitley in the County of Lancaster, was created in the Baronetage of the United Kingdom on 27 December 1814 for Robert Holt Leigh. He was a classical scholar who also represented Wigan in the House of Commons. The title became extinct on his death in 1843. He left a life interest in his estates to Thomas Pemberton (son of his cousin Margaret Leigh), who assumed the additional surname of Leigh and who was subsequently raised to the peerage as Baron Kingsdown: see Robin Leigh-Pemberton, Baron Kingsdown.

The Leigh Baronetcy, of Altrincham in the County of Chester, was created in the Baronetage of the United Kingdom on 9 February 1918 for the newspaper proprietor and Conservative politician John Leigh. He was owner of the Pall Mall Gazette and represented Clapham in the House of Commons between 1922 and 1945. During the First World War he funded the equipment of a hospital for wounded officers at Altrincham. As of 2022 the baronetcy is held by his grandson, Sir Christopher Leigh, 4th Baronet, who succeeded his brother in the title in 2021.

Leigh baronets, of Stoneleigh (1611)
See the Baron Leigh

Leigh baronets, of Newnham (1618)
See the Earl of Chichester (1644 creation)

Leigh baronets, of Tyrone (1622)
Sir Daniel Leigh, 1st Baronet, High Sheriff of Tyrone (died 1633) 
Sir Arthur Leigh, 2nd Baronet (died 1638).

Leigh baronets, of South Carolina (1773; dormant)
Sir Egerton Leigh, 1st Baronet (1733–1781), Attorney-General of South Carolina, created a baronet of Great Britain, styled of South Carolina, America.
The Revd Sir Egerton Leigh, 2nd Baronet (1762–1818), founding Minister of Rugby Baptist Church  
Sir Samuel Egerton Leigh, 3rd Baronet, FRSA (1796–1830), of Brownsover Hall, Warwickshire, who died abroad.

Leigh baronets, of Whitley (1814)
Sir Robert Holt Leigh, 1st Baronet (1762–1843).
See also Thomas Pemberton Leigh, 1st Baron Kingsdown

Leigh baronets, of Altrincham (1918)

Sir John Leigh, 1st Baronet (1884–1959) 
Sir John Leigh, 2nd Baronet (1909–1992) 
Sir Richard Henry Leigh, 3rd Baronet (1936–2021)
Sir Christopher John Leigh, 4th Baronet (born 1941)
the heir presumptive to the title is the present baronet's son, Edward John Leigh (born 1970).

See also
 Burke's Peerage & Baronetage

References

External links
www.nationalarchives.gov.uk
www.stirnet.com (Leigh genealogy)
Debrett's Peerage & Baronetage, 2015

 

Extinct baronetcies in the Baronetage of England
Extinct baronetcies in the Baronetage of Ireland
Baronetcies in the Baronetage of Great Britain
Extinct baronetcies in the Baronetage of the United Kingdom
Baronetcies in the Baronetage of the United Kingdom
Dormant baronetcies